The 2022 Papua New Guinea Tri-Nation Series was the 16th round of the 2019–2023 ICC Cricket World Cup League 2 cricket tournament and was played in Papua New Guinea in September 2022. It was a tri-nation series between Namibia, Papua New Guinea and the United States cricket teams, with the matches played as One Day International (ODI) fixtures. The ICC Cricket World Cup League 2 formed part of the qualification pathway to the 2023 Cricket World Cup. Originally scheduled to take place in May 2021, the series was postponed on 12 February 2021 due to the COVID-19 pandemic.

Squads

Fixtures

1st ODI

2nd ODI

3rd ODI

4th ODI

5th ODI

6th ODI

References

External links
 Series home at ESPNcricinfo

2022 in American cricket
2022 in Namibian cricket
2022 in Papua New Guinean cricket
International cricket competitions in 2022–23
Papua New Guinea
Papua New Guinea Tri-Nation Series
Papua New Guinea Tri-Nation Series